CLCL may refer to:

Canada Lands Company
Central Lancashire Cricket League
CLCL, an assembly language code for the IBM System/370

See also

 CL (disambiguation)

 CL2 (disambiguation)